Harton Academy (formerly Harton Technology College, or Harton Comprehensive School) is a mixed secondary school and sixth form located in South Shields, South Tyneside, England. It was founded on the existing site in 1936.

In 2006, Ofsted rated the school as 'outstanding' and it has received three Government Achievement awards, as well as being named in the 'top 50 most improved specialist schools' throughout the UK. In 2009 Ofsted highlighted Harton as one of 12 outstanding schools serving disadvantaged communities. In 2013, they delivered a similar report.

As part of the Building Schools for the Future initiative, in 2010 the school completed twenty-five million pounds' worth of construction on a new sixth-form building—holding specially designed DT, maths and science blocks—which initially housed existing pupils while refurbishment of the main building was under way. The school designed the new building specifically for sixth form usage with whole-school maths, science, design technology and cafeteria, whilst the refurbished old block contains English, humanities, computer science, music and modern foreign languages. In the summer of 2015, the swimming pool facilities were redeveloped to the cost of £400,000.

In 2011, the National College for Teaching and Leadership announced Harton Academy as one of the first one hundred teaching schools to be designated from the start of 2011–2012 academic year; one of only five secondary schools in the north east, and one of only fifty-six secondary schools in the country, to receive the recognition. This new designation entitles the academy to lead the training and professional development of staff from across the North East region.

Gallery

Notable former pupils

South Shields High School (1885–1936)
 Sir Robert Chapman, 1st Baronet, MP for Houghton-le-Spring, Territorial Army officer 
 Harry Eltringham, entomologist
 Robert Cooke Fenwick, aircraft designer
 Walter Runciman, 1st Viscount Runciman of Doxford
 Francis Scarfe, poet

Westoe Secondary School (1890–1936)
 Jack Brymer, clarinettist
 James Kirkup, controversial poet

South Shields High School for Boys (1936–1953)
 John Erickson, historian 
 Ron Fenton, footballer
 James Mitchell, writer of When the Boat Comes In and Callan
 David Phillips (chemist), professor of physical chemistry from 1989–2006 at Imperial College, and gave the 1987 Christmas Royal Institution lecture
 Donald Pickering, actor
 David Alan Walker, Professor of Biology from 1970–84 at the University of Sheffield
 Sir Robert Wilson (astronomer)

South Shields Grammar-Technical School for Boys (1953–1974)
 Barry Clarke, professor of civil engineering geotechnics since 2008 at the University of Leeds, and of civil engineering from 1998–2008 at Newcastle University, and president from 2012–13 of the Institution of Civil Engineers
 Robert Colls, professor of English history at the University of Leicester
 Ian Michael Davison, PLO terrorist – for which Pan Am Flight 73 was hijacked on 5 September 1986 to free him from serving life imprisonment in a Cyprus prison for the murder of three Israelis
 John Gray (philosopher), School Professor of European Thought from 1998–2007 at the LSE
 Kevin Maguire (journalist), Daily Mirror main political journalist (at the comprehensive from 1974)
 John F. Pollard, historian
 Edward Wilson – actor

Harton Comprehensive (1974–2001)
 Jared Deacon, 2002 European and Commonwealth gold medallist, GBR 4×400 relay, Sydney 2000 Olympics
 Nick Pickering, footballer
 Chris Ramsey, comedian
 David Wilson, rugby union player
 Martyn Waghorn, professional footballer

Harton Technology College (2001–2017)
 Kane Avellano, Guinness World Record for youngest person to circumnavigate the world by motorcycle (solo and unsupported) at the age of 23 in 2017.
 Joe McElderry, The X Factor 2009 winner.

References

External links

 Site for old pupils

Education in South Shields
Academies in the Metropolitan Borough of South Tyneside